Andamia tetradactylus is a species of combtooth blenny found in the western Pacific Ocean, around the Ryukyu Islands and Indonesia. the IUCN classify this species as Data Deficient as this species, Andamia heteroptera  and A reyii are confused and their exact distributions are uncertain.

References

tetradactylus
Fish described in 1858